A Million Fish ... more or less is a 1992 children's picture book by Patricia McKissack. It is about a boy of the bayou, Hugh Thomas, who has a fishing adventure.

Reception
Booklist, in a review of A Million Fish, called it "a joyful story about storytelling" and concluded "Rooted in the words and landscape of Louisiana's Bayou Clapateaux, this celebrates that we all live in "a mighty peculiar place." Entertainment Weekly wrote: "Dena Schutzer’s paintings swirl with movement and high-spirited fun, and Patricia McKissacks’ narrative is expansive, evocative, and tangy with Southern-flavored dialect. In all, a fine read-aloud for a hot summer day."

A Million Fish has also been reviewed by Kirkus Reviews, School Library Journal, Publishers Weekly,

Awards
1992 CCBC Choice
1994 Kaleidoscope: A Multicultural Booklist for Grades K-8
1995 Young Hoosier Award Picture Book (K-3) - nominee
1996 NCTE Books That Invite Talk, Wonder, and Play

References

1992 children's books
American picture books
Tall tales
Books by Patricia McKissack